Man Finds Food (currently called Secret Eats) is an American food reality television series that premiered on the Travel Channel on April 1, 2015. The series is hosted by food enthusiast Adam Richman who tracks down secret specialities in cities all over America.

The show was scheduled to debut July 2, 2014, with episodes airing every Wednesday night at 9:00 pm ET, but Travel Channel delayed the program indefinitely after Richman posted crude messages on his Instagram account in response to people criticizing a hashtag he had used in one of his pictures. It was unknown when and if the show would air. The show page reappeared on the Travel Channel's website and ultimately premiered at 9:00 pm ET on April 1, 2015, with two back-to-back episodes ("Incognito in Escondido" and "Chi-Town Franken-Sandwich").

Despite the delay on Travel Channel, Australian channel 7mate broadcast the first episode of the series on October 7, 2014. They also ran promotional advertising for the show within the Seven Network group of channels. The station has listed the episode as the first in a 3-episode series. The episodes were available on the Plus7 catchup service after a placeholder page for the show was created on the service.

For Season 2, the show's name was changed to Secret Eats with Adam Richman. The first episode aired on August 8, 2016 on the Travel Channel.

Season 1 and 2 episodes currently air on the Cooking Channel (all of which are being aired under the season 2 name of Secret Eats with Adam Richman). The episodes premiered on the network on January 9, 2018.

Premise
In each episode of Man Finds Food, Adam Richman travels the country in his food quest to discover the many culinary secrets of the most unusual and delicious specialities at eating establishments in each U.S. city he visits. He delves deeper by exposing their off-menu hidden dishes and what he calls "off-the-grid" restaurants which even the locals don't know about.

For Secret Eats with Adam Richman, Richman's focus shifts from restaurants in the U.S. to those in different countries around the world.

Episodes

Season 1 (2014-2015)

Season 2 (2016-2017)
Note: For this season, the show was renamed Secret Eats with Adam Richman.

References

External links

 

2014 American television series debuts
2017 American television series endings
2010s American reality television series
English-language television shows
Food travelogue television series
Food reality television series
Travel Channel original programming